Stockland Townsville Shopping Centre is centrally located in Aitkenvale within the urban area of Townsville, Queensland, Australia. The shopping centre is Townsville's largest shopping centre.  In 1987 Stockland Townsville opened after a major upgrade to what was previously known as Nathan Plaza (named after the street the centre runs along). In October 2012 Stockland opened a new 2 level Myer department store, a new Woolworths and mini major, Rebel, plus other specialty stores including a 750-seat foodcourt. The centre is also home to Townsville's first Big W store. Stockland Townsville Kmart Centre (formerly Kmart Plaza & Centro Townsville) was acquired in March 2012 and includes Kmart, Coles and 25 specialty stores.

Further Expansion Plans 
Stockland Group has earmarked its Aitkenvale shopping centre for further development after completion of its present $180 million makeover in 2012. Stockland chief executive commercial property John Schroder said the company was moving ahead with design and planning for an additional 10,000-14,000sq m of floorspace in a new building to be developed on nearby 1.8ha landholding. With a major retailer the additional facility would feature a number of mini-major retailers and a food precinct along its frontage to Elizabeth St.  Development of a cinema complex is also being considered, according to John Schroder's statement at the Myer opening in October 2012.  Stockland has submitted a DA in December 2013 comprising an 8 screen cinema complex over 2 levels, a gym, medical centre and up to 6 restaurants & cafés. This is the 1st stage with other stage/s to follow.  Elizabeth Street will end up being part of a town square which is part of the council plan for the area over the next 20 years. It is expected these stages of the expansion will commence from 2020 on-wards.

Public transport
Stockland Townsville is accessible by bus, and is one of the major bus interchanges on the Translink Townsville network. This is located on Ross River Road at the centre entrance. The taxi interchange is located at the main centre entrance as well.

See also

 List of shopping centres in Australia

References

External links
 Stockland Townsville website
 Sunbus official Website

Shopping centres in Townsville